The protected areas of Nepal cover mainly forested land and are located at various altitudes in the Terai, in the foothills of the Himalayas and in the mountains, thus encompassing a multitude of landscapes and preserving a vast biodiversity in the Palearctic and Indomalayan realms.
This extreme altitudinal gradient has resulted in 11 bio-climatic zones ranging from lower tropical below  to nival above  in the High Himalayas, encompassing nine terrestrial ecoregions with 36 vegetation types. Botanists recorded 1,120 species of non-flowering plants and 5,160 species of flowering plants. Nepal ranks 10th in terms of richest flowering plant diversity in Asia. Zoologists recorded 181 mammal species, 844 bird species, 100 reptile species, 43 amphibian species, 185 freshwater fish species, and 635 butterfly species. In recognition of the magnitude of biodiversity the Government of Nepal has established a network of 20 protected areas since 1973, consisting of ten national parks, three wildlife reserves, six conservation areas and one hunting reserve.

Additionally, nine Ramsar sites were declared between 1988 and 2008.
Two wildlife reserves were declared as national parks in 2017.

National parks
 Chitwan National Park – 
 Sagarmatha National Park – 
 Langtang National Park – 
 Rara National Park – 
 Khaptad National Park – 
 Shey Phoksundo National Park – 
 Bardiya National Park – 
 Makalu Barun National Park – 
 Shivapuri Nagarjun National Park – 
 Banke National Park – 
 Shuklaphanta National Park – 
 Parsa National Park –

Wildlife reserves
 Koshi Tappu Wildlife Reserve –

Conservation areas
 Annapurna Conservation Area – 
 Kanchenjunga Conservation Area – 
 Manaslu Conservation Area – 
 Blackbuck Conservation Area – 
 Api Nampa Conservation Area – 
 Gaurishankar Conservation Area –

Hunting Reserve
 Dhorpatan Hunting Reserve –

Ramsar Sites 
The following Ramsar sites were declared between 1988 and 2008:
 Bishazari Tal – 
 Ghodaghodi Tal – 
 Gokyo Lake Complex – 
 Gosaikunda – 
 Jagdishpur Reservoir – 
 Kosi Tappu Wildlife Reserve – 
 Mai Pokhari – 
 Phoksundo Lake – 
 Rara Lake – 
 Lake Cluster of Pokhara Valley –

References

External links
 Department of National Parks and Wildlife Conservation, Nepal

 
Nepal geography-related lists
Nepal
Protected areas
Nepal
Cultural heritage of Nepal